Moral certainty is a concept of intuitive probability. It means a very high degree of probability, sufficient for action, but short of absolute or mathematical certainty.

Origins
The notion of different degrees of certainty can be traced back to a statement in Aristotle's Nicomachean Ethics that one must be content with the kind of certainty appropriate to different subject matters, so that in practical decisions one cannot expect the certainty of mathematics.

The Latin phrase moralis certitudo was first used by the French philosopher Jean Gerson about 1400, to provide a basis for moral action that could (if necessary) be less exact than Aristotelian practical knowledge, thus avoiding the dangers of philosophical scepticism and opening the way for a benevolent casuistry.

The Oxford English Dictionary mentions occurrences in English from 1637.

Law
In law, moral (or 'virtual') certainty has been associated with verdicts based on certainty beyond a reasonable doubt.

Moral certainty, a quantum of evidence of about 100 percent proof, is required in two kinds of cases:
 In a criminal prosecution, when no direct evidence exists, the circumstantial evidence must be morally certain; see Lizzie Borden.
 In a paternity testing case, when a putative father has been adjudicated to be the actual father by clear and convincing evidence, then moral certainty is required to disprove paternity, the onus being moved to the newly found father.

Legal debate about instructions to seek a moral certainty has turned on the changing definitions of the phrase over time. Whereas it can be understood as an equivalent to 'beyond reasonable doubt', in another sense moral certainty refers to a firm conviction which does not correlate but rather opposes evidentiary certainty: i.e. one may have a firm subjective gut feeling of guilt – a feeling of moral certainty – without the evidence necessarily justifying a guilty conviction.

See also

References

Further reading
 James Franklin, The Science of Conjecture: Evidence and Probability Before Pascal (Johns Hopkins University Press, 2001), ch. 4

External links
Legal definition of "moral certainty"
"And the moral of the story is...", on the dangers of moral certainty. Ideas, CBC Radio 1. February 17, 2010.

Legal doctrines and principles
Sociology of law
Skepticism
American legal terminology
Criminal law
Criminal procedure
Legal reasoning